The Banggai Archipelago is a group of islands, which are located at the far eastern end of Central Sulawesi, Indonesia. It makes up a regency (kabupaten) of Central Sulawesi Province of Indonesia, created in 1999 by splitting the existing Banggai Regency into a new Banggai Regency situated on the mainland of Sulawesi (capital, Luwuk) and a Banggai Islands Regency then comprising the entire archipelago (with its capital at Banggai town). In December 2014 a further splitting of the Regency was the removal of the more southerly seven districts (including Banggai Island itself, together with smaller islands to its southwest and southeast) to form a new Banggai Laut Regency.

The reduced Banggai Islands Regency thus comprises the main island of Peleng together with various small offshore islands. It covers an area of 2,488.79 km2 and has a population of 109,384 at the 2010 census and 120,142 at the 2020 Census; the official estimate as at mid 2021 was 121,684. The archipelago is surrounded by the Banda Sea's Gulf of Tolo (Teluk Tolo), and the Molucca Sea. The Peleng Straits (Selat Peleng) separate it from mainland Sulawesi.

Administrative Districts 
The Banggai Islands Regency is divided into twelve districts (kecamatan), tabulated below with their areas and their populations at the 2010 Census  and the 2020 Census, together with the official estimates as at mid 2021. The table also includes the location of the district headquarters, the numbers of administrative villages (rural desa and urban kelurahan, totalling 141 and 3 respectively) and of offshore islands in each district, and its postal codes.

Notes: (a) including kelurahan of Salakan. (b) including kelurahan of Bulagi (town). (c) including kelurahan of Sabang.

Transportation
Merpati Nusantara Airlines served the islands from Palu (the capital of Central Sulawesi Province). There is also a bus service via Luwuk and thence by boat or ship to Banggai.

Endangered Banggai Cardinalfish
The Banggai Islands is home to the Banggai cardinalfish. This species has an extremely limited geographic range (5,500 km2) and small total population size (estimated at 2.4 million). The Banggai cardinalfish is composed of isolated populations concentrated around the shallows of 17 large and 10 small islands within the Banggai Archipelago.
It is threatened by extinction due to collection for the aquarium trade.

Climate
Salakan has a tropical rainforest climate (Af) with moderate rainfall from August to January and heavy rainfall from February to July.

References

 
Populated places in Indonesia
Islands of Indonesia